Jawahar Science College, a co-educational institution started under the care of the Jawahar Education Society. The college is affiliated with Thiruvalluvar University.

History 
Pandit Jawaharlal Nehru insisted on the development of Science & Technology. The college was named after him and it was decided to start several job oriented courses. The college started functioning with a student strength of 120. Honorable Minister,  Shri P.Chidambaram inaugurated this college on 18-10-1987.

Campus 
The college functions in a building in a 40 acres site near NPTI in Block-14, Neyveli, Tamil Nadu, India.

Academics 
The college offers the following 3-year Undergraduate courses.
 B.Sc. Computer Science
 B.Sc. Chemistry
 B.Sc. Geology
 B.Sc. Mathematics
 B.Com.
 B.C.A
 B.Sc. Environmental Management
 B.A. English 
 B.B.A
 B.Sc. Nutrition Food Science Management & Dietetics

The college offers the following 2-year Postgraduate courses.

 M.Sc. Chemistry
 M.Sc. Mathematics
 M.S.W (Master of Social Works)
 M.A English
 M.Com.

Clubs 
 Rotaract Club
 Leo Club
 NSS Units I & II
 Citizen Consumer Club
 Junior Jaycees
 Red Ribbon Club

References

Education in Cuddalore district
Academic institutions formerly affiliated with the University of Madras
Educational institutions established in 1987
1987 establishments in Tamil Nadu
Colleges affiliated to Thiruvalluvar University